.qa is the Internet country code top-level domain (ccTLD) for Qatar.

History
As of September 2011, members of the general public can register Qatar Internet domain names (.qa) that are available through accredited registrars. Prior to the making the .QA domain available to the public, QDR held a “sunrise” period for the domains which enabled trademark holders and government entities to register for the Qatar-specific domain names.

As of 2014, thirteen registrars have been accredited by Qatar Domains Registry to offer the domain names. These registrars are Qtel, W3infotech, IP Mirror, Ascio, MarkMonitor, Marcaria (registrar), EPAG Domainservices, Safenames, Thexyz, CPS-Datensysteme, DomainMonster, and InternetX.

Qatar Domains Registry, regulated by the Communications Regulatory Authority, manages Qatar's country code top-level domains (ccTLD), which includes domains which are offered through accredited registrars and other closed domains related to Qatari institutions which means you must register your domain name directly from the Qatar Domains Registry. Qatar is among the first countries in the world to be able to offer domain names in Arabic, قطر. domain represents Qatar's Arabic language online identity.

Qatar domains available through approved registrars are: .qa, .com.qa, .net.qa, .name.qa and Arabic قطر. the latter of which is represented as .xn--wgbl6a in Punycode.

The domains that are registered directly from the Qatar Domains Registry are : .gov.qa, .mil.qa, .org.qa, .edu.qa and .sch.qa.

Second-level domains
 .com.qa – Commercial organisations; registered trademarks.
 .edu.qa – Licensed Higher educational organisations in Qatar.
 .sch.qa – Licensed private and public schools in Qatar.
 .gov.qa – Governmental organisations.
 .mil.qa – Ministry of State for Defense Affairs/Qatar Armed Forces.
 .net.qa – Licensed networks of data communications.
 .org.qa – Nonprofit organisations.

References

External links
 IANA .qa whois information
 Qatar Internet Domain Names
 Qatar Domains Registry
 For the IDN version of the website.

Country code top-level domains
Telecommunications in Qatar
Internet in Qatar
Computer-related introductions in 1996

sv:Toppdomän#Q